This page is a list of all the matches that Portugal national football team has played between 1980 and 1999.

Results

1980

1981

1982

1983

1984

1985

1986

1987

1988

1989

1990

1991

1992

1993

1994

1995

1996

1997

1998

1999

External links
Portugal: Fixtures and Results - FIFA.com
Seleção A Jogos e Resultados FPF
Portugal national football team match results
Portugal - International Results

1980s in Portugal
1990s in Portugal
Portugal national football team results